Bjørnsholm Bay is a bay in the Limfjord, along Himmerland's west coast,  southwest of Løgstør, Denmark. Near Bjørnsholm and the Vitskøl monastery, Bjørnsholm Å (Bjørnsholm Stream) runs into the bay, and almost four kilometers to the south Trend Å (Trend Stream) has its mouth at Trend, where there is a cottage area. Nearby in the Limfjord is the island of Livø, whose southeastern tip, Livø Tab, almost reaches the bay.

References

Bays of Denmark